Ngbee is an extinct Bantu language of uncertain affiliation. Guthrie assigned to the Nyali cluster, Ethnologue classifies it as a Nyali language. Glottolog places it near the Ngendan languages.

References

Bantu languages
Languages of the Democratic Republic of the Congo
Nyali languages